Tirimüjgan, formerly Pembroke Castle, was a cargo ship launched in 1883 and purchased by the Ottoman Empire from the United Kingdom in 1906, requisitioned as a destroyer tender and used in the Italo-Turkish War, Balkan Wars and served during World War I.

Design 
Her hull was made of steel. The ship was powered by a compound steam engine fed by two Barrow boilers creating , transmitting power to a propeller attached to a single shaft.

Operational history

United Kingdom period 
The ship was ordered from the Barrow Shipbuilding Co. in 1882 under the name of Pembroke Castle. The ship, which started construction in 1883 at Yard 105, was launched in May 1883; sea trials were completed in July of the same year and delivered to the London-based Castle Mail Packet Company. In 1900, she was purchased by the Union-Castle Line, also based in London.

Ottoman period 
In 1906, she was purchased by the Ottoman Empire and placed under the command of the İdare-i Mahsusa. In 1908 she joined the Ottoman Navy as a destroyer tender.

In 1909, she took part in training in May 1909 as part of the reforming program of Admiral Douglas Gamble, commander of the British naval mission in Istanbul. The torpedo boats , Mosul, Kütahya, Alpagot, Hamidiye, Demirhisar and Sivrihisar sailed from Sivriada and joined the fleet, practicing torpedo attacks against larger ships. Representatives of the United Kingdom observed the exercise from Tirimüjgan. Although the exercise was not in realistic combat conditions, it was the first naval exercise of the Ottoman Navy in twenty years. At the end of the exercise, all ships passed in front of the royal yacht Ertuğrul, which was waiting off Sarayburnu. In 1910 she was redeployed as a transport ship.

On 16 December 1912, she formed the 3rd Division together with Reşidpaşa and Intibah and served as a repair ship in the Battle of Elli. She transmitted the semaphores of Samsun and Akhisar, which served as lookouts to the main fleet. On January 10, 1913, she again supported communications during the Ottoman raids on the Aegean. In 1914, she was reclassified as an engineering training ship.

In May 1915, she was assigned as a fixed ammunition depot ship in Çanakkale. In February 1919 she was made a depot ship in Izmir and in April 1919 she was given to the Seyrisefain Administration. Nusret and Tirimüjgan were released after a few weeks. The Treaty of Sevres included the disarmament of the ship and its conversion into a merchant ship, but the treaty did not enter into force.

On March 31, 1920, while carrying military personnel between Istanbul and Trabzon, she ran aground at the mouth of the Kızılırmak River, off Cape Bafra, and was damaged beyond repair, thus she could not be salvaged. In 2017, the wreck was dismantled and started to be removed to be sold as scrap.

Footnotes

References
 

1886 ships
Ships of the Union-Castle Line
World War I naval ships of the Ottoman Empire